Shijingshan District is an urban district of the municipality of Beijing. It lies to the west of the urban core of Beijing, and is part of the Western Hills area, bordering the districts of Haidian to the northeast and east, Fengtai to the south, and Mentougou to the west. The district consists of 9 subdistricts of Beijing's city proper.

Although the hills around Yunju Temple may also be called Shijingshan, they have Chinese characters different from those of the district and hence are unrelated to Shijingshan District.

Its postal code is 100043.

Administrative divisions
There are 9 subdistricts in the district:

Transportation
The western stretch of the 5th Ring Road lies in this area. The Beijing subway serves this area. China National Highway 109 runs through Shijingshan.

Metro
Shijingshan District is currently served by 4 metro lines of the Beijing Subway system:

  - Pingguoyuan, Gucheng, Bajiao Amusement Park, Babaoshan, Yuquanlu
  - Jin'anqiao, Pingguoyuan, Yangzhuang, Xihuangcun
  - Pingguoyuan, Jin'anqiao

Important areas
 North China University of Technology
 Babaoshan Revolutionary Cemetery
 Shijingshan Amusement Park
 Shougang industrial complex
 Institute of High Energy Physics (IHEP), Chinese Academy of Sciences

Economy
In 2017, the regional GDP of the district was 53.54 billion yuan, with GDP per capita at 87.5 thousand yuan.

Education

Sports
The district is the location of hosting the 2008 Summer Olympics BMX and track-cycling events at the location of the Laoshan Velodrome, as well as hosting the 2022 Winter Olympics Big Air snowboarding and freestyle skiing events at the Big Air Shougang.

Climate 

Shijingshan District has a humid continental climate (Köppen climate classification Dwa).

References

 
Districts of Beijing
Venues of the 2022 Winter Olympics
Olympic snowboarding venues